Kassia, Cassia or Kassiani (– before 865) was a Byzantine-Greek composer, hymnographer and poet. She holds a unique place in Byzantine music as the only known woman whose music appears in the Byzantine liturgy. Approximately fifty of her hymns are extant, most of which are stichera, though at least 26 have uncertain attribution. The authenticity issues are due to many hymns being anonymous, and others ascribed to different authors in different manuscripts. She was an abbess of a convent in the west of Constantinople.

Additionally, many epigrams and gnomic verses are attributed to her, at least 261. Kassia is notable as one of at least two women in the middle Byzantine period known to have written in their own names, the other being Anna Comnena. Like her predecessors Romanos the Melodist and Andrew of Crete, the earliest surviving manuscripts of her works are dated centuries after her lifetime.

Name
Her name is a feminine Greek form of the Latin name Cassius. It is variously spelled Κασσιανή (contemporary pronunciation ), Κασ(σ)ία (Kas[s]ia), Εικασία (Eikasia), Ικασία (Ikasia), Kassiani, Cas[s]ia, Cassiane, Kassiana.  Modern English-language references to her as a composer generally use the name "Kassia," while references to her religious life tend to use Kassia or Kassiani.

Life

Kassia was born between 805 and 810 in Constantinople into a wealthy family and grew to be exceptionally beautiful and intelligent. Three Byzantine chroniclers, Pseudo-Symeon the Logothete, George the Monk (a.k.a. George the Sinner) and Leo the Grammarian, claim that she was a participant in the "bride show" (the means by which Byzantine princes/emperors sometimes chose a bride, by giving a golden apple to his choice) organized for the young bachelor Theophilos by his stepmother, the Empress Dowager Euphrosyne. Smitten by Kassia's beauty, the young emperor approached her and said: "Through a woman [came forth] the baser [things]," referring to the sin and suffering coming as a result of Eve's transgression.  Kassia promptly responded, "And through a woman [came forth] the better [things]," referring to the hope of salvation resulting from the Incarnation of Christ through the Virgin Mary.   According to tradition, the verbatim dialogue was:
"-." "-." 
Unsatisfied with her response, Theophilos rejected her and chose Theodora as his wife.

When next we hear of Kassia in 843 she had founded a convent in the west of Constantinople, near the Constantinian Walls, and became its first abbess. Although many scholars  attribute this to bitterness at having failed to marry Theophilos and to become Empress, a letter from Theodore the Studite indicates that she had other motivations for wanting a monastic life. It had a close relationship with the nearby monastery of Stoudios, which was to play a central role in re-editing the Byzantine liturgical books in the 9th and 10th centuries, thus ensuring the survival of her work (Kurt Sherry, p. 56). However, since the monastic life was a common vocation in her day, religious zeal is as likely a motive as either depression or aspiration for artistic renown.

The Emperor Theophilos was a fierce iconoclast, and any residual feelings he may have had for Kassia did not preserve her from the imperial policy of persecution for her defence of the veneration of icons. Among other things, she was subjected to scourging with a lash. In spite of this, she remained outspoken in defence of the Orthodox Faith, at one point saying, "I hate silence when it is time to speak."

After the death of Theophilos in 842 his young son Michael III became Eastern Roman Emperor, with Empress Theodora acting as Regent. Together they ended the second iconoclastic period (814-842); peace was restored to the empire.

Kassia traveled to Italy briefly, but eventually settled on the Greek Island of Kasos where she died sometime between 867 and 890. In the city of Panaghia, there is a church where Kassia's tomb/reliquary may be found

Works

Overview
Kassiani wrote many hymns which are still used in the Byzantine liturgy to this day. She became known to the great Theodore the Studite, while she was still a young girl, and he was impressed by her learning and literary style. She not only wrote spiritual poetry, but composed music to accompany it. She is regarded as an "exceptional and rare phenomenon" among composers of her day At least twenty-three genuine hymns are ascribed to her. Her oeuvre as a whole demonstrates influence from classical Greek literature, which she studied early in life.

Sacred music

Hymn of Kassia
The most famous of her compositions is the eponymous Hymn of Kassia (also known as the Troparion of Kassiani), which is chanted each year at matins on Holy Wednesday (which in usual parish practice is sung Tuesday evening) at the end of the aposticha.

Tradition says that in his later years the Emperor Theophilus, still in love with her, wished to see her one more time before he died, so he rode to the monastery where she resided. Kassia was alone in her cell, writing her Hymn when she realized that the commotion she heard was because the imperial retinue had arrived.  She was still in love with him but was now devoted to God and hid away because she did not want to let her old passion overcome her monastic vow.  She left the unfinished hymn on the table. Theophilus found her cell and entered it alone. He looked for her but she was not there; she was hiding in a closet, watching him. Theophilus, overcome with sadness, cried and regretted that moment of pride when he rejected such a beautiful and intellectual woman; then he noticed the papers on the table and read them.  When he had finished reading, he sat and added one line to the hymn; then he left. The line attributed to the Emperor is the line "those feet whose sound Eve heard at dusk in Paradise and hid herself for fear." Legend says that as he was leaving he noticed Kassia in the closet but did not speak to her, out of respect for her wished privacy. Kassia emerged when the emperor was gone, read what he had written and finished the hymn.

The music for the hymn is slow, sorrowful and plaintive, lasting about ten to twenty minutes, depending on tempo and style of execution.  It requires a very wide vocal range, and is considered one of the most demanding pieces — if not the most demanding one — of solo Byzantine chant, and cantors take great pride in delivering it well.  It is also sung by choirs in unison, often underpinned by Byzantine vocal bass drone.  The faithful make a point of going to church specifically "to listen to Kassiani" that evening. In many places in Greece, the Bridegroom Matins service of Great Tuesday is popular with sex workers, who may not often be seen in church at other times of the year. They come in great numbers, in order to hear the Hymn of Kassiani, as the hymn is associated with the woman fallen in many sins.

Secular writings
261 works of secular literature are attributed to Kassia, consisting of epigrams and gnomic verses. Never set to music, they were written during the reigns of Theophilos and Michael III. Akin to the rest of her oeuvre, her writings demonstrate influence from classical Greek literature, which she studied early in life. These literary genres were chiefly dominated by men, so her contributions would have been unusual; Byzantinist Andrew Mellas noted that "perhaps this was an advantage for Kassia and accounts for her originality".

The genre of epigrams had existed from classical antiquity and into the Byzantine empire, being defined as somewhere in between the scope of lyric and epic poetry. Their exact organization was unformalized, ranging from the use of couplets to iambic pentameter, among others. The works are generally rooted in the long tradition, though they include her own unique innovations. In this genre, she is credited with first synthesizing secular and sacred values. While the works are secular in character, they promoted ethical teachings for the lives of Christians. Byzantinist  described this approach as "An osmosis of ancient wisdom and monastic truth". Kassia abandoned typical themes found in Greek prosody, preferring to discuss more individual and personal issues. In addition to ethnical ideals, the themes Kassia covers include ethnical weaknesses (her examples include 'foolishness' and 'friendship'); social structures; femininity (particularly 'beauty'); and the defense of women's rights. This approach would have made the genre more relevant and accessible to the Byzantine people, though the extent of her epigrams' circulation remains unclear. Her epigrams are particularly reminiscent of similar works by her colleague Theodore the Studite, and are characterized by a concise and straight forward presentation, often including witty or humorous elements. According to Mellas, it is probable that they were "a form Catechism for her nuns and perhaps any friends of the monastery."

Kassia's gnomic verses were much shorter, usually a single-verse teachings. They often include moral adages and like the epigrams, were succinct.

Portrayals
Many fictitious stories were created around her relationship with Emperor Theofilos. Contemporary historians such as Glykas, Ptochoprodromos, Kodinos, Zonaras, and Georgios Amartolos described her exile in Italy during the Iconoclasy wars and later settled and died in Kasos sometime between 867 and 890.

She is portrayed by Karima McAdams in the 5th season of the television series Vikings.

In August 2019, English singer-songwriter Frank Turner included a song told from her point of view on his album No Man's Land.

Other works
Among the other hymns she composed are the following:

The Doxastichon chanted at the Vesperal Divine Liturgy on Christmas Eve
Numerous hymns in honor of saints found in the Menaion (fixed cycle of the Eastern Orthodox liturgical calendar), such as Feast of the Nativity of the Forerunner, 24 June.
 Among her hymns in the Triodion (liturgical book used during Great Lent) are the irmoi for the Matins Canon of Great Thursday.
 Her longest composition is a Canon for the Departed, consisting of 32 strophes, to be chanted at a Parastas (memorial services).

Religious commemoration
The feast day of Saint Kassiani is celebrated by the Orthodox Church on 7 September.

She is often depicted on the icon of the Sunday of Orthodoxy (the First Sunday of Great Lent), because of her strong defence of the veneration of icons.

In 2022, Kassia was officially added to the Episcopal Church liturgical calendar with a feast day on 7 September.

Recordings
The following are commercial recordings of the music of Kassia:

 Kronos Quartet: Early Music (Lachrymæ Antiquæ), USA 1997. Includes an instrumental arrangement of Kassia's "Using the Apostate Tyrant as His Tool".
 Sarband : Sacred Women, Women as Composers and Performers of Medieval Chant. Dorian, USA 2001. Album contains one piece by Kassia, Augustus-Sticheron Idiomelon Doxastikon: Vespers of 25 December (Athens MS 883) which is also recorded on the album by VocaMe.
 Deborah Kayser & Nick Tsiavos The Fallen Woman CD released 2008. Includes a recording of the Kassia Hymn.
 VocaMe : Kassia - Byzantine hymns of the first woman composer. Christophorus, Germany 2009. 18 tracks, with full sung texts in Greek script, German and English translations.
Choral Settings of Kassiani: with members of Cappella Romana and the English Chamber Choir. Various recordings of the Troparion of Kassiani and When Augustus Reigned. Released in 2011.
Hymns of Kassiani, hymns of Christmas, the Triodion and Holy Week. Cappella Romana, Alexander Lingas. Released in 2021.

References

Sources
Books and chapters

 
 
 
 

Encyclopedia and journal articles

Further reading

External links
 
 Works by Kassia at the Princeton University Library

9th-century births
9th-century deaths
9th-century women writers
9th-century Christian saints
9th-century Byzantine writers
9th-century Byzantine nuns
9th-century composers
9th-century women composers
Byzantine composers
Byzantine poets
Byzantine women writers
Greek women composers
Byzantine saints of the Eastern Orthodox Church
Christian abbesses
Christian hymnwriters
Byzantine hymnographers
Christian female saints of the Middle Ages
Women hymnwriters
9th-century Greek musicians
Anglican saints
Constantinopolitan Greeks
Saints from Constantinople